Lieutenant General Sir Paul Anthony Travers   (15 August 1927 – 10 June 1983) was an English officer who was Quartermaster-General to the Forces.

Military career
Travers was commissioned into the South Lancashire Regiment in 1947.

In 1978 he was selected to be Chief of Staff at the Logistics Executive before moving on, in 1979, to be Vice-Quartermaster-General. In 1981 he was appointed General Officer Commanding South East District and in 1982 he became Quartermaster-General to the Forces; he died in office in 1983. He is buried in Aldershot Military Cemetery.

He was also Colonel Commandant of the Royal Corps of Transport and the Army Legal Corps.

References

 

|-
 

|-

1927 births
1983 deaths
Military personnel from London
People from Wandsworth
British Army lieutenant generals
South Lancashire Regiment officers
Knights Commander of the Order of the Bath
Burials at Aldershot Military Cemetery